Howard George Yanosik (born January 26, 1933) is a Canadian retired professional hockey player who played 605 games for the Hershey Bears in the American Hockey League.

External links
 

1933 births
Living people
Canadian ice hockey defencemen
Hershey Bears players
Lethbridge Broncos coaches
Canadian ice hockey coaches